Anabuki may refer to:

Anabuki (surname)
Anabuki Construction, a Japanese construction and real estate company
Anabuki Kosan, a Japanese real estate company, now separate from the above
Anabuki, Tokushima, now part of Mima on Shikoku, Japan
 Anabuki Station
Anabuki River, a tributary of Yoshino River on Shikoku, Japan